Thiru R. Doraikkannu (28 March 1948 – 31 October 2020) was an Indian politician and member of the 15th Tamil Nadu Legislative Assembly from the Papanasam constituency. He represented the All India Anna Dravida Munnetra Kazhagam (AIADMK) party. He won his seats from Papanasam in the 2006, 2011 and 2016 elections.

J. Jayalalithaa appointed Doraikkannu as Minister for Agriculture in May 2016. This was his first cabinet post in the Government of Tamil Nadu.

Biography
Doraikkannu was born on 28 March 1948, in Rajagiri. He had a B.A. degree and was married with six children. 

He died on 31 October 2020, at the Kauvery Hospital in Chennai, of complications from COVID-19 during the COVID-19 pandemic in India. He was admitted to the hospital on 13 October 2020, and was on ECMO and ventilator life support, prior to his death. He is survived by his wife and children.

References 

1948 births
2020 deaths
Tamil Nadu MLAs 2006–2011
Tamil Nadu MLAs 2011–2016
Tamil Nadu MLAs 2016–2021
All India Anna Dravida Munnetra Kazhagam politicians
State cabinet ministers of Tamil Nadu
People from Thanjavur district
Deaths from the COVID-19 pandemic in India
Tamil Nadu politicians